Ngozi Therese Chuma-Udeh (/ŋgɔzi tə’ri:zə tʃu:mə ude/; NGO-zi tuh-RAYZ CHU-ma-ude) is a Nigerian professor of English (African and comparative literature stress). She is a teacher, an orator, academic, novelist, poet, and activist for women and children. an orator, a poet, a dramatist and a fiction writer. She served as the University Orator at Anambra State University (now Chukwuemeka Odumegwu Ojukwu University) between the years 2012 and 2017 and is currently the Commissioner for the Anambra State Ministry of Education  and the Secretary, Anambra State Education Advisory Board.

Education 
Chuma-Udeh attended the University of Port Harcourt, where she received a bachelor's degree in English language and literature/letters. She moved to Nnamdi Azikiwe University, where she obtained a master's degree in English language and literature/letters and a doctorate degree in comparative literature.

Career 
Chuma-Udeh is a fiction editor at Sentinel Literary Quarterly, United Kingdom. She also served as the department head of English, Anambra State University for two tenures. She served as Coordinator General English Studies, Anambra State University for two tenures; Associate Dean of Arts; Dean Faculty of Arts and chair, Local Organizing Committee for Faculty of Arts International Conferences. Ngozi is also an editor/reviewer for PMLA (Journal of the Modern Language Association MLA); associate editor, ANSU Journal of Integrated Knowledge and associate editor, ANSU Journal of Arts and Social Science, Anambra State University.

On 11 April 2022, the governor of Anambra State, Prof. Charles Chukwuma Soludo, appointed Chuma-Udeh as the Anambra State Commissioner for Education.

Publications

International journals 
 
 "Morality in the Indian Oral Literatures: Portrayal of Jatakas and Panchatantra in the Short Stories of Manjo Das." The Vedic Path. A Quaterly English Journal of Gurukul Kangri Vishwavidyalaya, Haridwar, India. Vol. XCII. No. 1&2. Jan & April, 2017
 "Symbiosis of Literature and Philosophy: A Comparative Discourse." Journal of the Literati Philosophia, (JOLP). Vol.2 No2 July,2015.pp. 11–21.
 
 
 "Ezeulu in the Binary Systems of Chinua Achebe's Arrow of god and the Implications for the contemporary Nigerian Democracy." Okike: An African Journal of New Writing. No. 52, November, 2014.pp 216–234
 "Nigerian Feminist Literature and Sustainable Development: Kaine Agary's Yellow Yellow and Chimamanda Adichie's Purple Hibiscus." The Vedic Path, A Quarterly English Journal of the Faculty of Arts, Gurukul Kangri Vishwavidyalaya University, Haridwar, Uttarakhand, India.Vol.LXXXVIII.
 "Unoka: The Gentleman Ill-at-Ease with the Code of Traditional Society in Chinua Achebe's Things Fall Apart."Okike: An African Journal of New Writing. No. 51, July, 2014.pp 240-255
 Language Literature and National Consciousness. Book of Proceedings from the First International Conference of the Department of English, Anambra State University, 2013, Nnolim, E. C, Adimora, Akachi and Chuma-Udeh, Ngozi
 Aboriginalism to Womanism: X-Raying Nuruddin Farah's From a Crooked Rib and Ngozi Chuma-Udeh's Echoes of A New Dawn. African Journal of Education, science and Technology. Vol.1: No.1 Oct. University of Eldoret, Kenya, 2013.pp 72-88
 Texts and Contours of the Argentine Literature: Traversing the Terrain of de Literatura Argentinidad. Sentinel Literary Quarterly of World Literature, London. March. 2013
 Aboriginalism to Womanism: X-Raying Nuruddin Farah's From a Crooked Rib and Ngozi Chuma-Udeh's Echoes of A New Dawn. African Journal of Education, science and Technology. Vol.1: No.1 Oct. University of Eldoret, Kenya, 2013.pp 72-88
 "The Doubter." Okike: An African Journal of New writing. N0. 50. October, 2013. (Commemorative Edition in Honour of the Founding Editor, Professor Chinua Achebe.)
 "The Niger Delta, Environment, Women and Politics of Survival in Kaine Agary's Yellow Yellow." Ecocritical Literature: Regreening African Landscapes. (Ed by  Okuyade), African Heritage Press, New York. 2013
 "Ovid's Pyramus and Thisbe and Shakespeare's Romeo and Juliet:  Didacticism versus Emotionalism in the Ill-Fated Lover Motif." Sentinel Literary Quarterly of World Literature, London
 "The Injured Party in Akachi. Adimora-Ezeigbo's Children of the Eagle. LA Journal of Southern Methodist University Dallas. "
 Discordia Concors in South African Literature: The Psychology of the Interregnum, Sentinel Literary Quarterly of World Literature, London December, 2012

Other publications 
 Community Based Approach to Promoting and Sustaining Indigenous Languages. Igu Aro Enugwu-Ukwu na Umunri Journal of Language and Culture. Vol.5. No. 1, Dec. 2020.
 "Conceptualizing Retributive Justice and Human Dignity in Chinua Achebe's Things Fall Apart and Arrow of god; Chuma-Udeh, Ngozi and  Udeh Bryan Jachukwuike. "ANSU Journal of Arts and Humanities." Vol.5. No. 2. July, 2019. ISSN: 2449-0741.
 50 Years of Arrow of God: Negotiating the shared Community Experiences within the Framework of Globalization. Essays on Leadership Questions in Chinua Achebe's Arrow of God. A Publication of the Association of Nigerian Authors. Kraft Books, 2017.Pg 202-214. ISSN: 978-978-918-459-0
 "Creative Panache and Social Milestone: Tanure Ojaide and the Niger Delta Polemics. Will the Cockerel Ever Hatch?" ; Chuma-Udeh, Ngozi.and  Udeh Bryan Jachukwuike.Journal of the Literati Philosphia (JOLP). Vol.4. No. 2. December, 2017. ISSN: 2504-8759.
 Understanding Women Empowerment in the Indian Literatures: Women Characters in the Mahabharata.  "ANSU Journal of Arts and Humanities." Vol.3. No. 3. July, 2016. ISSN: 2449-0741; Ashima Shrawan and Chuma-Udeh, Ngozi.
 "Nigerian Literature and the Paradox of Security: An X-ray of Maik Nwosu's Invisible Chapters and Chimeka Garricks' Tomorrow Died Yesterday." Journal of the Literati Philosphia (JOLP). Vol. No. 2. December, 2016. ISSN: 2504-8759.
 "Authoritarianism in Nigerian Literature: An Analysis of Helon Habila's Waiting for an Angel." ANSU Journal of Language and Literary Studies (AJLLS). Vol. 2. No. 2, December, 2015.
 "Women in African Epics: A Critical Analysis of the Treatment of Women Characters in J P Clark's The Ozidi Saga and D T Niane's Sundiata. Gender Discourse in African Theatre, Literature and Visual Arts; A Festschrift in Honour of Professor Mabel Evwierhoma. Ed. Tracie Chima Utoh-Ezeajugh and Barclays F. Ayakoroma: Kraft Books, April, 2015.
 "The Injured Party in Akachi Adimorah's Children of the Eagle." ANSU Journal of Arts and Humanities. Vol.2 No2 July,2015.pp 25–32. ISSN:2449-0741
 "Introduction to Literature." Understanding the English Language. Ed. Ifejirika E, and Chukwueloka C. 2015.pp 114–136.
 "Music in the Oral Literatures of the Sephardic Jews and the Igbos of Eastern Nigeria: A Comparative Analysis." Awka Journal of Research in Music and the Arts. Vol.10, July, 2014.pp 15–32.
 "Nurturing Creativity for Societal Advancement in Least Developed Countries (LDC's): The Nigerian Experience." Book of Proceedings from a Three Days Colloquium on Creative Writing for Teachers on 'Sustaining English and Igbo Languages in the 21st Century.' May, 2014. pp 5–17.
 "Imaginative literature, Social Responsibility and National Development: Nigerian Writers on a Rat Race." ANSU Journal of Arts and Humanities. Vol.1 No1 July,2014.pp 1–11.
 "Negotiating the Landscape of the Earliest Manifestation of Igbo Written Literatures." Nka- Ana, Journal of the Association of Nigerian Authors (Anambra Chapter). Vol.3 No.2. July 2014. pp 14–24.
 "Merging the Chasm between the Fictive and the Factual: Saro Wiwa's Panacea for Reconciling the National Question." ANSU Journal of Language and Literary Studies (AJLLS) Vol.1 No.1 July 2014. pp 9–20.
 Beyond the Pains of Repression: Chimeka Garicks' Tomorrow Died Yesterday and the Intricacies of the Niger Delta Palaver. Book of Proceedings from the First International Conference on Language Literature and National Consciousness held by the Department of English, Anambra State University. March, 2013.
 Ben Okri's Magic Realism: Blending the Identity and Culture of the Nigerian Writer in The Famished Road. ANSU Journal of Arts and Social Sciences Vol.2.No.1, 2013.
 "Sublimity of Arts in Morden African Literature: X-raying Chinua Achebe's Things Fall Apart as an Art on the Sublime."ANSU Journal of Arts and Social Sciences Vol.1.No.1, 2012.
 "Once Upon the Treatment of Women in African Epics: A Study of Sundiata the Epic of Old Mali and the Ijaw Epic Ozidi Saga. ANSU Journal of Integrated Knowledge.Vol.2 No, 1, Sept, 2012
 The Ozidi Saga-Demonstrating the Continuing Vitality of the Epic Tradition in the African Context. Songs of Gold- Fresh Perspectives on J. P. Clark. A Publication of the Association of Nigerian Authors. 2011.
 The Fictive Art and the Theatre in Nigeria: Two Phenomenal Literary Genres at the Crossroads of Myth, Fantasy, and Social Context. ANA REVIEW, an Annual Journal of the Association of Nigerian Authors. Vol.2 No.2. 2011
 "The Burgle and the Siren." ANA REVIEW, an Annual Journal of the Association of Nigerian Authors. Vol.2 No.2. 2011.
 "Teach Me Nonsense." ANA REVIEW, an Annual Journal of the Association of Nigerian Authors. Vol.2 No.2. 2011.
 "The Epic in Africa: Telling the World the African Story through the Improvisation of J.P.Clark's Ozidi Saga."  ANSU JOURNAL OF INTERGRATED KNOWLEDGE. Vol. 1, No 1. September, 2011.
 "Duality of Nature as the Elemental Force of the Epic Hero and the Epic Action in the African Heroic Narratives: Ozidi and Sundiata."  Nka- Ana, Journal of the Association of Nigerian Authors (Anambra Chapter). Vol.1 No.2. 2011.
 "An Ode to Ker." Cerebral (ity). An Anthology of Poems Celebrating David I. Ker on his 60th Birthday.
 Prologue to  Mantras of Hope(collection of poems by the 2010/11 Graduating students of the Department of English ANSU)
 "The Music and Rhetoric's of Nigerian Folk Literature: A Review of Rems Umeasiegbu's Folkloristic Contrivances." Awka Journal of Research in Music and the Arts. Vol.8, July, 2011.
 "Globalization and Nigerian Literature, a Symbiotic experience: Critical Analysis of Wole Soyinka's You Must Set Forth At Dawn and Chuks Iloegbunam's Surbenia's Day, Book of proceedings from International Conference on African Literature and Development in The twenty First Century, faculty of Arts Nnamdi Azikiwe University, Awka, 2010.
 "Motherhood as Victimhood: A critical Analysis of Tsi Tsi Dangarembga's, Nervous Conditions, and Oluremi Obasanjo's Bitter-Sweet." Nka- Ana, Journal of the Association of Nigerian Authors (Anambra Chapter). Vol.1 No.1. 2010.
 Ideological Commitment in Chuks Iloegbunam's Surbenia's Day and Festus Iyayi's Violence. Arts and Humanities Quarterly Vol. 5 No. 4. October, 2010.
 Na so I see Am." (Poems in Pidgin English) Nka- Ana, Journal of the Association of Nigerian Authors (Anambra Chapter). Vol.1 No.1. 2010.
 "Implications of social Realism to the Nigerian Poet Today: A Review of Ezenwa Ohaeto's The Voice of the Night Masquerade." Book of Proceedings from African Literature and Development in the Twenty-First Century. Ezenwa Ohaeto International Memorial Conference, 2009.
 He Lives On (Eulogizing the Resident Poet, Ezenwa Ohaeto) Book of Proceedings from African Literature and Development in the Twenty-First Century. Ezenwa Ohaeto International Memorial Conference, 2009.
 Literature and Governance: The Gap between Fiction and Faction- Wole Soyinka's Dramaturgy as An X-Ray of Nigeria's Polity. The Humanities and Nigerias' Experience. Book of Proceedings, Faculty of Arts Nnamdi Azikiwe University, Awka, 2009.
 "50 years after Things Fall Apart Soars On" Weekly Trust Book shelf (periscoping the literati) Jan. 2008
 "Gothic Perspective in Rems Umeasiegbu's Ghost Stories". Arts and Humanities Quarterly Vol. II, No 2. December, 2007.
 "The African Novel as a Product of History: A Study of Rems  Umeasiegbu's Out of the House of Slavery." Arts and Humanities Quarterly Vol. 1. No 2. June, 2006.
 "The Music of Poetry" English Studies: Facts, Patterns and Principles Vol. 2.
 "Comprehension: Mastering the Reading Process"  English Studies: Facts, Patterns and Principles Vol. 2
 " Improving Your Speech"  English Studies: Facts, Patterns and Principles Vol. 1; Chuma-Udeh Ngozi and Echezona Ifejirika

Books 
 Welcome to the Literary World 11.Malchjay Publishers. 180 pages
 Caribbean Literature (Text and Context). Rex Charles and Patricks Publishers, Nimo. 450  pages
 Perspectives on Shakespeare. Malchjay Publishers. 168 pages
 Chuma-Udeh Ngozi and Ifejirika Echezona. English Studies: Facts, Patterns, and Principles Vol. 2 Onitsha: African First Publishers, 240 pages
 Chuma-Udeh Ngozi and Ifejirika Echezona. English Studies: Facts, Patterns, and Principles Vol. 1. Onitsha: African First Publishers, 280 pages
 Welcome to the Literary World 1. Malchjay Publishers. 78 pages
 Trends and Issues in Nigerian Poetry. Base 5. 173 pages
 Ngozi. Trends and Issues in Nigerian Literature (Prose). Malchjay Publishers. Onitsha. 360 pages

Fiction 

 Forlorn Fate (A Niger Delta Statement). Paperworks Publishers Enugu, 372 pages
 Ojadili, an Igbo Epic (A translation). Onitsha: Malchjay Publishers
 The Presidential Handshake. Nimo: Rex Charles and Patricks, 350 pages
 Dreams of Childhood. (A fictional Biography of professor Pita Nwabueze Ejiofor) Nimo: Rex Charles and Patricks.160 pages
 Chants of Despair. A collection of Poetry. Malchjay  Publishers
 The Journey of Faith. A play. Adopted by Catholic Women  Organization as the 2010 Conference Drama. Malchjay Publishers
 Echoes of a New Dawn. Onitsha: Malchjay Publishers, 240 pages
 Teachers on Strike. Africana First Publishers, 181 pages

Children's fiction 
 Chuma-Udeh, Ngozi. The Escape of Amara. Malchjay Publishers, Onitsha. 34 pages
 Amara The Little House Help. Malchjay Publishers, Onitsha. 35 pages
 The Rescue of Amara. Malchjay Publishers, Onitsha. 36 pages
 Amara Goes to School. Malchjay Publishers, Onitsha. 74   pages

Awards 
 West African Award for the contemporary children's fiction organized by The National Youths Renaissance, Nigeria
 Winner Association of African Women Writers' Masterpiece 2010 Award, Dakar, Senegal, 2010
 Winner West African Writers' Children's Literary Renaissance Award, Takoradi Ghana,2005

References 

Living people
Nigerian academic administrators
Nigerian academics